The 2005 floor crossing window period in South Africa was a period of 15 days, from 1 to 15 September 2005, in which members of the National Assembly and the provincial legislatures were able to cross the floor from one political party to another without giving up their seats. The period was authorised by the Tenth Amendment of the Constitution of South Africa, which scheduled regular window periods in the second and fourth September after each election. The previous general election had been held on 14 April 2004.

In the National Assembly, the floor-crossing expanded the African National Congress' (ANC) representation from 279 to 293 seats, giving it control of almost three-quarters of the 400-member house. Other existing parties mainly lost seats, with several entirely new parties being created; still-existing parties created in 2005 include the National Democratic Convention

Seven of the nine provincial legislatures were also affected, with only the Free State and North West legislatures remaining unchanged. In both the KwaZulu-Natal Provincial Legislature and the Western Cape Provincial Parliament the ANC received enough members to move from a plurality to an absolute majority; in KwaZulu-Natal it gained two members to control 40 of the 80 seats, while in the Western Cape it gained five, to give it 24 of the 42 seats.

This window period also saw the final demise of the New National Party, in which all its members crossed the floor, mostly to become ANC representatives.

The tables below show all the changes; in those provinces not listed there was no change in the provincial legislature.

Tables

National Assembly

|-style="background:#e9e9e9;"
!colspan="2" style="text-align:left"|Party
!Seats before
!Net change
!Seats after
|-
|
|279
| +14
|293
|-
|
|50
| −3
|47
|-
|
|28
| −5
|23
|-
|
|9
| −3
|6
|-
|
|7
| −2
|5
|-
|
|7
| −3
|4
|-
|
|4
| 0
|4
|-
|bgcolor="#eeeeee"|
|style="text-align:left"|National Democratic Convention
|
| +4
|4
|-
|
|3
| 0
|3
|-
|
|3
| 0
|3
|-
|
|2
| 0
|2
|-
|
|
| +2
|2
|-
|
|1
| 0
|1
|-
|bgcolor="#eeeeee"|
|style="text-align:left"|Federation of Democrats
|
| +1
|1
|-
|bgcolor="#eeeeee"|
|style="text-align:left"|Progressive Independent Movement
|
| +1
|1
|-
|bgcolor="#eeeeee"|
|style="text-align:left"|United Party
|
| +1
|1
|-
|
|7
| −7
|
|-style="background:#e9e9e9;"
!colspan="2" style="text-align:left"|Total
!colspan="3" style="text-align:center"|400
|}

Eastern Cape Provincial Legislature

|-style="background:#e9e9e9;"
!colspan="2" style="text-align:left"|Party
!Seats before
!Net change
!Seats after
|-
|
|51
| 0
|51
|-
|
|5
| 0
|5
|-
|
|6
| −2
|4
|-
|
|
| +2
|2
|-
|
|1
| 0
|1
|-style="background:#e9e9e9;"
!colspan="2" style="text-align:left"|Total
!colspan="3" style="text-align:center"|63
|}

Gauteng Provincial Legislature

|-style="background:#e9e9e9;"
!colspan="2" style="text-align:left"|Party
!Seats before
!Net change
!Seats after
|-
|
|51
| 0
|51
|-
|
|15
| −3
|12
|-
|
|2
| 0
|2
|-
|bgcolor="#eeeeee"|
|style="text-align:left"|Federal Alliance
|0
| +2
|2
|-
|
|1
| 0
|1
|-
|
|1
| 0
|1
|-
|
|1
| 0
|1
|-
|
|1
| 0
|1
|-
|bgcolor="#eeeeee"|
|style="text-align:left"|Alliance of Free Democrats
|
| +1
|1
|-
|
|
| +1
|1
|-
|
|1
| −1
|0
|-style="background:#e9e9e9;"
!colspan="2" style="text-align:left"|Total
!colspan="3" style="text-align:center"|73
|}

KwaZulu-Natal Provincial Legislature

|-style="background:#e9e9e9;"
!colspan="2" style="text-align:left"|Party
!Seats before
!Net change
!Seats after
|-
|
|38
| +2
|40
|-
|
|30
| −3
|27
|-
|
|7
| −2
|5
|-
|bgcolor="#eeeeee"|
|style="text-align:left"|National Democratic Convention
|
| +4
|4
|-
|
|2
| 0
|2
|-
|
|2
| −1
|1
|-
|
|1
| 0
|1
|-style="background:#e9e9e9;"
!colspan="2" style="text-align:left"|Total
!colspan="3" style="text-align:center"|80
|}

Limpopo Provincial Legislature

|-style="background:#e9e9e9;"
!colspan="2" style="text-align:left"|Party
!Seats before
!Net change
!Seats after
|-
|
|45
| 0
|45
|-
|
|2
| 0
|2
|-
|
|1
| 0
|1
|-
|
|
| +1
|1
|-
|
|1
| −1
|0
|-style="background:#e9e9e9;"
!colspan="2" style="text-align:left"|Total
!colspan="3" style="text-align:center"|49
|}

Mpumalanga Provincial Legislature

|-style="background:#e9e9e9;"
!colspan="2" style="text-align:left"|Party
!Seats before
!Net change
!Seats after
|-
|
|27
| 0
|27
|-
|
|2
| 0
|2
|-
|bgcolor="#eeeeee"|
|style="text-align:left"|Christian Party
|
| +1
|1
|-
|
|1
| −1
|0
|-style="background:#e9e9e9;"
!colspan="2" style="text-align:left"|Total
!colspan="3" style="text-align:center"|30
|}

Northern Cape Provincial Parliament

|-style="background:#e9e9e9;"
!colspan="2" style="text-align:left"|Party
!Seats before
!Net change
!Seats after
|-
|
|21
| +3
|24
|-
|
|3
| 0
|3
|-
|
|2
| −1
|1
|-
|
|1
| 0
|1
|-
|
|1
| 0
|1
|-
|
|2
| −2
|
|-style="background:#e9e9e9;"
!colspan="2" style="text-align:left"|Total
!colspan="3" style="text-align:center"|30
|}

Western Cape Provincial Parliament

|-style="background:#e9e9e9;"
!colspan="2" style="text-align:left"|Party
!Seats before
!Net change
!Seats after
|-
|
|19
| +5
|24
|-
|
|12
| +1
|13
|-
|
|2
| 0
|2
|-
|
|
| +2
|2
|-
|
|3
| −2
|1
|-
|
|1
| −1
|0
|-
|
|5
| −5
|
|-style="background:#e9e9e9;"
!colspan="2" style="text-align:left"|Total
!colspan="3" style="text-align:center"|42
|}

National Council of Provinces
The National Council of Provinces was reconstituted as a result of the changes in the provincial legislatures. Its reconstituted makeup was as follows:

|-style="background:#e9e9e9;"
!colspan="2" style="text-align:left"|Party
!style="text-align:left"|Delegate type
!EC
!FS
!G
!KZN
!L
!M
!NW
!NC
!WC
!colspan=2|Total
|-
| style="width: 4px" bgcolor= rowspan=2|
| style="text-align: left;" scope="row" rowspan=2 | 
|style="text-align:left"|Permanent
|4
|4
|4
|3
|5
|5
|4
|4
|3
|36
|rowspan=2|68
|-
|style="text-align:left"|Special
|4
|4
|3
|2
|4
|4
|4
|4
|3
|32
|-
| style="width: 4px" bgcolor= rowspan=2|
| style="text-align: left;" scope="row" rowspan=2 | 
|style="text-align:left"|Permanent
|1
|1
|1
|1
|1
|1
|1
|1
|2
|10
|rowspan=2|12
|-
|style="text-align:left"|Special
|
|
|1
|
|
|
|
|
|1
|2
|-
| style="width: 4px" bgcolor= rowspan=2|
| style="text-align: left;" scope="row" rowspan=2 | 
|style="text-align:left"|Permanent
|
|
|1
|2
|
|
|
|
|
|3
|rowspan=2|4
|-
|style="text-align:left"|Special
|
|
|
|1
|
|
|
|
|
|1
|-
|
|style="text-align:left"|Permanent
|
|
|
|
|
|
|
|1
|
|colspan=2|1
|-
|
|style="text-align:left"|Permanent
|
|1
|
|
|
|
|
|
|
|colspan=2|1
|-
|
|style="text-align:left"|Permanent
|
|
|
|
|
|
|1
|
|
|colspan=2|1
|-
|
|style="text-align:left"|Permanent
|1
|
|
|
|
|
|
|
|
|colspan=2|1
|-
|
|style="text-align:left"|Permanent
|
|
|
|
|
|
|
|
|1
|colspan=2|1
|-
|bgcolor="#eeeeee"|
|style="text-align:left"|National Democratic Convention
|style="text-align:left"|Special
|
|
|
|1
|
|
|
|
|
|colspan=2|1
|-style="background:#e9e9e9;"
!colspan="3" style="text-align:left"|Total
!10
!10
!10
!10
!10
!10
!10
!10
!10
!colspan=2|90
|}

Notes to the tables

See also
 Floor crossing (South Africa)
 2003 South African floor-crossing window period
 2007 South African floor-crossing window period

References

2005 in South Africa
Political history of South Africa
September 2005 events in South Africa